Addison is an 'L' station on the CTA's Brown Line. It is an elevated station with two side platforms, located at 1818–20 West Addison Street in Chicago's North Center neighborhood.

History

Addison Station opened in 1907 as part of the Northwestern Elevated Railroad's Ravenswood branch.

Brown Line Capacity Expansion Project
The Brown Line Capacity Expansion Project aims to allow eight car trains on the Brown Line by the extension of the platforms at all stations. At the same time all Brown Line stations are being upgraded to meet ADA requirements. On December 2, 2006, Addison station closed for 12 months to be rebuilt as part of this project. The station reopened on December 3, 2007, the same day which the Irving Park station closed for renovations.

Bus connections
CTA
  152 Addison

Notes and references

Notes

References

External links 

Addison (Ravenswood Line) Station Page
 Train schedule (PDF) at CTA official site
Addison Street entrance from Google Maps Street View

CTA Brown Line stations
Railway stations in the United States opened in 1907
1907 establishments in Illinois